Ujjain Divisional Cricket Association is the governing body of the Cricket activities in the Ujjain Division of Madhya Pradesh in India and the Ujjain Divisional cricket team. It is affiliated to the Madhya Pradesh Cricket Association who is member of Board of Control for Cricket in India. UDCA is a regular participant in all domestic tournaments conducted by the MPCA. In the recent past, UDCA has contributed in shaping up the careers of renowned Indian cricketers like Naman Ojha, Devendra Bundela etc.hiru kabra is secretrey of ujjain division

Home ground 

 Government Boys Higher Secondary School No 2
 Indian Iron and Steel Company Stanton Pipe Factory Ground - Hosted few Ranji Trophy matches
 Mahakal Institute of Technology Ground
 Ujjain International Cricket Stadium - Proposed

References

External links
 
 Cricinfo's Complete History of the Indian Domestic Competitions
 Academy

Cricket administration in India
Sport in Madhya Pradesh
Sport in Ujjain
Organisations based in Ujjain
Cricket in Madhya Pradesh
Year of establishment missing